Guará is a municipality in the state of São Paulo, Brazil.

Guara may also refer to:

Places
 Guará Area of Relevant Ecological Interest, state of São Paulo, Brazil
 Guará, Federal District, Brazil
 Guará oil field, off the coast of Rio de Janeiro, Brazil
 Guará River in Bahia state, eastern Brazil

Organisms
 Guara (moth), a moth genus
 Guará wolf, or maned wolf, the largest canid of South America

People
 Paulinho Guará (born 1979), Brazilian footballer

Other uses
 AV-VB4 RE 4x4 GUARÁ, a Brazilian armoured personnel carrier
 Clube de Regatas Guará, a Brazilian football team
 De Tomaso Guarà, a sports car produced from 1993 to 2004
 Guara (centerboard), a hardwood component of Andean rafts
 Guara (Larense), an informal descriptive term for people from Lara State, Venezuela